Lincoln County High School is a public secondary school located in Stanford, Kentucky, USA. It was opened in August 1974 for the 1974–1975 school year, after the consolidation of the local high schools of the towns of Lincoln County; Stanford, Crab Orchard, Hustonville, McKinney, and King Mountain area (Memorial). In the 2016–2017 school year, 1027 students were enrolled at Lincoln County High School. An estimated 24,456 people live in Lincoln County as of 2017, so the students of Lincoln County High School represent 4.20% of the county's population.

The mascot is the "Patriot", a man clad in red, white and blue American Revolution era garb.

Across the board, the percentage of students of Lincoln County High School scoring "Proficient" or "Distinguished" in their standardized tests is higher than that of students in the district and the state. The graduation rate for students of Lincoln County High School is 96.2%, 3.1% more students than the district and 6.4% more students than the state.

Lincoln County High School's campus is located on Education Way. This campus is shared with Lincoln County Middle School and Lincoln County Area Technology Center.

References

External links
 Lincoln County High School official site 
 Greatschools.net Profile
 Central Kentucky Sports Magazine Covers Your Patriots

Schools in Lincoln County, Kentucky
Public high schools in Kentucky
Educational institutions established in 1974
1974 establishments in Kentucky
Stanford, Kentucky